Spirit of London was an Italian built cruise ship put into service in 1972. In January 2012, Runfeng Ocean Deluxe Cruises took over as operator, renaming the ship Ocean Dream.

Delayed construction
The vessel was originally ordered in 1970 by Norwegian Caribbean Line as Seaward. The shipyard, Cantieri Navali del Tirreno & Riuniti, encountered financial troubles and was consequently taken over by the IRI Group, which canceled the building contract of Seaward. After much protest from NCL the IRI Group agreed to partially complete the vessel. Despite this Norwegian Caribbean sold the hull to P&O, which would complete the Seaward as Spirit of London.

Due to being originally ordered for Norwegian Caribbean Line Spirit of London had a sister ship in the NCL fleet, Southward. Both vessels' superstructures are identical, however the funnels differed. Although Southward is smaller in tonnage than Spirit of London, both are 537 feet long.

History
In 1974, P&O bought Princess Cruises and transferred Spirit of London to their fleet, with Princess operating her as Sun Princess, alongside Island Princess and Pacific Princess.

In September 1979 whilst under charter to Mutual of Omaha and cruising from Portland to San Francisco, a fire broke out in the laundry room. Lifeboats were lowered to embarkation level but were not used as the fire was brought under control.

1988 saw the sale of Sun Princess by P&O to Premier Cruises, where it was initially named Majestic, becoming Starship Majestic in 1989 which included refurbishment of her interior. The majority of the Columbo 1975 episode "Troubled Waters" was filmed in the interior of the ship, creating a video time capsule of the ship's history before her refurbishment. During this time Premier Cruise Line became the licensed partner cruise line with Disney. In 1991, a fire in the auxiliary engine room sent passengers and crew scrambling for the lifeboats and left the ship dead in the water, resulting in the ship being towed back to Florida. In 1994, she was purchased by CTC and was renamed Southern Cross. She was renamed again in 1998 when Festival Cruises began operating her as Flamenco.

When Festival Cruises collapsed in 2004,  she was sold for $12.25 million at a bankruptcy auction to Cruise Elysia, who renamed her New Flamenco. In 2007 Club Cruise acquired New Flamenco. Club Cruise had New Flamenco serve as a hotel ship in New Caledonia until they failed in late 2008. The vessel was sold for scrap after over a year of lay up off Singapore. In 2012 the ship was saved from the scrapyard and was renamed Ocean Dream with a dragon painted on her bow. Then owned by Runfeng Ocean Deluxe Cruises, she began operating cruises from Haikou, China to Halong Bay, Vietnam.

Legal Dispute 
On 13 February 2004, the ship, then known as The New Flamenco, was chartered by her then-owners, Cruise Elysia Inc to Fulton Shipping of Panama for a year. The ship was then purchased by Globalia Business Travel who assumed the rights and liabilities of the previous owners under the charterparty by novation. Globalia and Fulton extended the charter for two years in August 2005, to be returned on 28 October 2007. The charterparty was subsequently extended for another two years on 8 June 2007. Fulton subsequently disputed the last extension, and returned the ship on 28 October 2007. Globalia accepted this as an anticipatory repudiatory breach, and commenced arbitration against Fulton for breach of contract, seeking the net loss of profits they would have earned during the last 2-year extension. Globalia contended that the Fulton had not actually suffered any loss because it managed to sell the ship at a substantial profit subsequently.

The case was appealed to the Court of Appeal, and subsequently to the Supreme Court. Lord Clark, delivering the unanimous judgment of the court, held that Fulton was liable for the net loss of profits Globalia suffered during the 2-year extension, and that the subsequent sale of the ship was res inter alios acta, and was not an act of mitigation.

Sinking and scrapping

The ship capsized and sank off Laem Chabang, Sri Racha, Thailand in shallow water on 27 February 2016 after having been abandoned without crew or maintenance for about a year. An attempt to upright the ship was made but failed. It was decided the ship would be scrapped on site. Photos later taken show the ship undergoing demolition starting sometime in late 2017. By the end of 2019, much of the wreck that was still above the waterline has now been removed.

In popular culture
The ship appeared briefly in the 1975 Starsky & Hutch episode, "Terror on the Docks", and in the 1975 Columbo episode, "Troubled Waters". The majority of "Troubled Waters", which guest starred Robert Vaughn, was filmed in the interior of the ship, creating a video time capsule of the ship's history from the start of her life.

The ship was also featured in at least one episode of The Love Boat, involving a competition between Captain Stubing of Pacific Princess and the captain of Sun Princess, and in the original 1976 TV movie, The Love Boat. She was also featured in the 1980 film Herbie Goes Bananas.

References

External links
  Official website 2014 Ocean Dream Cruise (Thailand) Co. Ltd.
 Official website of Ocean Dream / Runfeng Ocean Deluxe Cruises
 Flamenco History - cybercruises.com
 Photographs from shipspotting.com

Ships built in Italy
1972 ships
Ships of Norwegian Cruise Line
Ships of P&O Cruises
Ships of Princess Cruises
Maritime incidents in 2016
Sunken cruise ships